Richard Dale “Rick” Folk (born March 5, 1950 in Saskatoon, Saskatchewan) is a Canadian curler and former Member of the Legislative Assembly of Saskatchewan, where he represented the Progressive Conservative Party for one term from 1982 until 1986. He is a two-time world curling champion, representing Canada.  When curling in Canada, Folk represented both Saskatchewan and British Columbia.

Curling career

In 1974, Folk skipped the Saskatchewan team to the Canadian Mixed Curling Championship that year. Four years later, he attended his first Brier, skipping the Saskatchewan team. In 1980, he won his first Brier and went on to win the World Curling Championships, posting an undefeated record and defeating Norway in the final. In 1983, Folk won another Canadian Mixed Championship.

After serving in government, Folk moved to Kelowna, British Columbia.  He represented British Columbia at the Brier for the first time in 1989, and won his second Brier in 1994, this time skipping the B.C. team. He lost just one game at the Worlds that year, and beat Sweden in the final to claim gold in a low scoring 3-2 decision. In 1995, Folk played in his last Brier.  Folk and his rink from the 1994 World Championships were inducted into the BC Sports Hall of Fame in 1995.  Folk has also been honoured by the Saskatchewan Sports Hall of Fame as well as the Canadian Curling Hall of Fame.

Political career
Folk ran in the riding of Saskatoon University in the 1982 Saskatchewan provincial election for the Saskatchewan Progressive Conservative Party. Folk won the seat, and served as Minister for Culture and Recreation from 1983 to 1986. Folk was not re-elected in the 1986 election, losing to Peter Prebble of the Saskatchewan New Democratic Party.

Personal life
Folk was born in Saskatoon at the Saskatoon City Hospital, the son of Alex and Jen Folk. At the time of the 1994 Brier, Folk owned a curling and golf supply store in Kelowna.

References

External links
 

Living people
1950 births
Brier champions
Canadian mixed curling champions
Canadian male curlers
Canadian sportsperson-politicians
Curlers from British Columbia
Canadian curling coaches
Members of the Executive Council of Saskatchewan
Politicians from Saskatoon
Progressive Conservative Party of Saskatchewan MLAs
Sportspeople from Kelowna
Curlers from Saskatoon
World curling champions